Princess Marie Adelheid Amalie Clotilde of Saxe-Coburg and Gotha,  (8 July 1846, Neuilly-sur-Seine, Île-de-France, Kingdom of France – 3 June 1927, Alcsút, Hungary) was a Princess of Saxe-Coburg and Gotha by birth and an Archduchess of Austria through her marriage to Archduke Joseph Karl of Austria.

Family

Clotilde was the third child and eldest daughter of Prince August of Saxe-Coburg and Gotha and his wife Princess Clémentine of Orléans. Her youngest brother was Ferdinand I of Bulgaria and her paternal uncle was Ferdinand II of Portugal.

Marriage and issue
Clotilde married Archduke Joseph Karl of Austria, second son of Archduke Joseph, Palatine of Hungary and his wife Duchess Maria Dorothea of Württemberg, on 12 May 1864 in Coburg. Clotilde and Joseph Karl had seven children:

Archduchess Elisabeth Klementine of Austria (18 March 1865 – 7 January 1866)
Archduchess Maria Dorothea (14 June 1867 – 6 April 1932)
Archduchess Margarethe Klementine (6 July 1870 – 2 May 1955)
Archduke Joseph August Viktor Klemens Maria of Austria (9 August 1872 – 6 July 1962)
Archduke László Philipp of Austria (16 July 1875 – 6 September 1895)
Archduchess Elisabeth Henriette of Austria (9 March 1883 – 8 February 1958)
Archduchess Klothilde Maria of Austria (9 May 1884 – 14 December 1903)

Ancestry

References 

1846 births
1927 deaths
House of Saxe-Coburg-Gotha-Koháry
Princesses of Saxe-Coburg and Gotha
House of Habsburg
Austrian princesses
People from Neuilly-sur-Seine
Burials at Palatinal Crypt